Carlos Stephens aka Clos, is a record producer from New Orleans, Louisiana. He found fame as a member of No Limit Records' in-house production team, Beats by the Pound. He also was the only producer of No Limit to have outside distribution for an artist. Since leaving the label, he has founded his own record label Flame Entertainment. To date, Stephens has over 75 Million in credited record sales. Stephens has compiled nearly 900 Million in streams credited via Muso.Ai  Stephens has worked on over sixty-five major projects and is credited with three #1 Singles, Fourteen gold albums, Ten platinum, Two double platinum, one Triple platinum, & one Quadruple Platinum Album

Early years
Born In New Orleans, Louisiana but raised in the Gretna area, Carlos started producing music for a few local groups in the early nineties this allowed him to develop his skills and production methods.

No Limit Years 
In 1994 Stephens would produce for Ron Gray "The Bossman: which would be one of his final outside productions before joining the No Limit in-house production team of Beats by the Pound. Over the next few years he would provide substantial production for all No Limit artists, with his first major production on Silkk the Shocker's debut album The Shocker in 1996.

In 1996, Carlos, with the permission of Master P, became the only in-house producer to establish distribution outside No Limit Records. This allowed him to release his first artist, Skull Duggery and The Ghetto Commission in 1998. He would later receive nomination for Producer of the Year and collectively be voted as one of Hip-Hop's "Thirty Most Powerful People" by The Source.

In 1999, No Limit would see the departure of fellow Beats By The Pound production mates, as the only remaining member would oversee the majority of the next five years of production with multiple gold and platinum albums. Starting with Master P's platinum-selling album Only God Can Judge Me, and the title track for the film Light It Up. In 2000, Stephens would contribute production on the soundtrack to the HBO series Oz. Stephens and No Limit would follow up with the introduction of the 504 Boyz and his production of their self-titled platinum-selling debut album, with the lead single "Wobble Wobble" going Platinum, following this with the success of Master P's Gold album Ghetto Postage with its smash Platinum hit "Bout Dat". In 2001, Carlos would see his greatest commercial success with Lil Romeo's debut single "My Baby" reaching platinum status and also staying at number 1 on the Billboard charts for 10 weeks straight. The song "My Baby" was also the 2001 Billboard Single of the year.

After No Limit 
In 2002 Carlos began working with a partnership program for"Prodikeys" a developed by Creative Labs Nasdaq listed company. From 2004 - 2006 Carlos headed up the business development team with partner Gary Murray founder of Wise Technologies. The new company was called Mixcast Networks (formally OOH! t v) Mixcast was a strategic, development and content accusation and distribution firm with a wi-fi component, that reached malls, airports, travel plazas.

By 2008 Carlos would take the director's chair with his debut video "Be Fresh" for C-Murder's album Screamin' 4 Vengeance. Stephens also started consulting, via 31Minds LLC. with the sole purpose of helping companies with branding, and creating strategic alliances between the companies in unconventional ways to expand the awareness of the product.

References

External links 
 MTV Bio
 
 Discography

Living people
African-American record producers
American hip hop record producers
American hip hop DJs
Musicians from New Orleans
No Limit Records artists
Southern hip hop musicians
Businesspeople from New Orleans
Year of birth missing (living people)
21st-century African-American people